Sanggamryŏng, also known as Shangganling in Chinese, Triangle Hill in South Korea, and Jane Russell Hill in United States is a mountain pass in central North Korea.

The mountain pass is part of the Triangle Hill Complex, which is roughly 4 km north by northeast of Kimhwa. Situated in the valley between the Jane Russell Hill and the Sniper Ridge, the hamlet became famous in China because of the Battle of Shangganling, a large-scale battle in the Korean War. When the fighting broke out, the hamlet had already been leveled by bombings, with most of its residents displaced, and so it played no role in the battle itself.

References
 

Geography of North Korea
Kangwon Province (North Korea)